Transference is a phenomenon in psychoanalysis.

Transference may also refer to:

Psychology and psychotherapy
Transference focused psychotherapy, a type of therapy
Transference neurosis

Media
Transference (album), an album by the band Spoon
Transference: A Bipolar Love Story, a 2020 film
Transference (video game), a video game by the company SpectreVision
"Transference" (Gotham), an episode of Gotham